George Cummins (12 March 1931 – 29 November 2009) was an Irish professional footballer.

Cummins was an inside forward who played for St. Patrick's Athletic (prior to their joining the League of Ireland) before joining Everton in October 1950. He made just 24 appearances for the Merseyside club and didn't score before moving on to Luton Town in 1953. He went on to become one of Luton's best players over the next eight years, scoring 21 goals in 184 games and playing for them in the 1959 FA Cup Final.

After leaving Luton, Cummins later played for Cambridge City and Hull City.

At international level, Cummins won 19 caps for the Republic of Ireland, scoring five goals. His international debut was on 28 October 1953 in a 4–0 win over Luxembourg at Dalymount Park in a World Cup qualifier. In his second game for his country he scored the winner against the same opposition.

References

1931 births
2009 deaths
Association footballers from Dublin (city)
Republic of Ireland association footballers
Republic of Ireland international footballers
St Patrick's Athletic F.C. players
League of Ireland players
Everton F.C. players
Luton Town F.C. players
Cambridge City F.C. players
Hull City A.F.C. players
English Football League players
Ireland (FAI) international footballers
Association football inside forwards
Leinster Senior League (association football) players
FA Cup Final players